The ICP M09 is an Italian piston aircraft engine under development by ICP srl of Castelnuovo Don Bosco,  Piedmont. The engine is intended for aircraft in the European Fédération Aéronautique Internationale microlight and the American light-sport aircraft categories.

Design and development
Design work on the M09 started in about 2008 with work proceeding secretly until it was publicly announced in mid-September 2012. The design goals were compactness and quick installation.

The M09 was designed by Franco Lambertini, who previously designed Moto Morini motorcycle engines, although the engine has no commonality with other Lambertini motorcycle engines and is a clean-sheet design for aviation use.

It is equipped with a 2.95-to-1 reduction gearbox and has a dry weight of 67 kg (147 lbs). It incorporates an automatic decompressor starter installed on the exhaust valve camshaft. Fuel is delivered via electronic fuel injection. Turbocharging is envisioned for some future versions.

The family of engines is expected to produce  when fully developed, although the initial version is expected to produce . On initial runs it produced 

The first flight on an ICP Savannah S test bed aircraft was on 18 December 2014.

Specifications (M09)

References

Air-cooled aircraft piston engines
2010s aircraft piston engines